"I Don't Love You" is the third single from My Chemical Romance's third studio album, The Black Parade. Its music video premiered on the band's official YouTube and MySpace pages on March 7, 2007, and the single was released on April 3, 2007.

Background
"I Don't Love You" was released as a single on April 3, 2007, to the United Kingdom, following the band's other singles from the album, "Welcome to the Black Parade" and "Famous Last Words", both of which were successful hits for the band. The band opted to release "Teenagers" as the third single in the U.S. instead of "I Don't Love You". Despite this, the single was certified Gold on by the RIAA on October 21, 2021, and was certified Silver by the BPI on September 4, 2020. The band released the single in Canada, on MuchMusic on March 19.

History
While the band was touring, they began to record using the bus's recording unit. "I Don't Love You" was one of the only songs to be used on the second-to-last album from the tour bus jam sessions. Ray Toro and Gerard Way can be seen playing an early version of the song from the tour bus sessions on the 2006 DVD Life on the Murder Scene.

Music video
The music video was directed by Marc Webb who also directed three previous My Chemical Romance music videos, from their Three Cheers for Sweet Revenge album. Webb was chosen instead of Samuel Bayer who directed "Welcome to the Black Parade" and "Famous Last Words" from their third studio album The Black Parade. The music video is about two lovers, played by Colton Haynes and Cassandra Church, in a strange abstract world, and the video seems to tell the story of how their love quickly withers away until one leaves the other alone. Towards the end of the video, one of the band's amplifiers explodes along with two of the guitars. On March 7, 2007, the band exclusively premiered the video on their YouTube and Myspace pages. The video is in a black and white format, most likely to simulate more contrast between the two lovers. There were also reports by one observers of Gerard wearing a wedding band (as can be seen in the video), which Gerard was asked about in an interview with 97X, where he mentioned that he had 'found someone very special'. The video appeared on Kerrang! TV in the UK on March 9, 2007, and on Channel 4 in the UK on March 8, 2007. The clip also shows the band members falling but not landing, in the order of Mikey Way, Ray Toro, Bob Bryar, Frank Iero, and Gerard Way. The video was made available on March 19, 2007 for purchase on the UK iTunes Store. The video was released in New Zealand on March 13, 2007.

As of December 2022, the song has 125 million views on YouTube.

Reception
The song nabbed a positive 4/5 star review from music site Pitchfork Media, who claimed:
"..it's the band's first proper power ballad and, well, they should definitely think about writing dozens more." The single was released in Australia on May 16.

Track listing
All songs written by My Chemical Romance.
Version 1 (promotional CD)

Version 2 (CD and 7" vinyl)

Version 3 (7" vinyl)

Version 4 (CD)

Version 5 (digital download)

Version 6 (digital download)

Charts
"I Don't Love You" debuted at number 65 on the UK Singles Chart on downloads alone on March 25, 2007. It climbed to number 35, still on downloads alone the next week, on April 1, 2007. It rose to number 13 in its physical release.

Certifications

References

My Chemical Romance songs
2007 singles
Rock ballads
The Black Parade (rock opera)
Music videos directed by Marc Webb
Black-and-white music videos
Song recordings produced by Rob Cavallo
2006 songs
Reprise Records singles